Caihuaping Town is an urban town in You County, Hunan Province, People's Republic of China.
As of the 2000 census it had a population of 55,700 and an area of 78 square kilometers.

Cityscape
The town is divided into 16 villages and one community, the following areas: Da Community, Liutang Village, Sutang Village, Sujiang Village, Liuhe Village, Tanqiao Village, Suxi Village, Donglian Village, Dongjiao Village, Dongnan Village, Caitang Village, Tanzhou Village, Caiping Village, Tan'an Village, Cailong Village.

References

External links

Divisions of You County